Sana Askari (born 23 April 1988) is a Pakistani model and actress. She is known for portraying the character of Laila in Baraat Series.

Early life
Askari grew up in America and attended Beaconhouse School. She graduated from NAPA in 2010 and did her first theatre play Adhay Adhooray under NAPA's banner.

Career
Askari's first lead role was in Dareecha opposite Imran Aslam on ARY Digital. She has also appeared in Dolly ki Ayegi Baraat, Azar Ki Ayegi Baraat, Takkay ki Ayegi Baraat, Annie Ki Ayegi Baraat alongside Bushra Ansari, Ayesha Omar, Javed Sheikh, Alishba Yousuf, Saba Hameed and Hina Dilpazeer, Khushboo Ka Ghar opposite Faisal Qureshi on ARY Digital, Ladies Park opposite Azfar Rehman on Geo TV, and Main Abdul Qadir Hoon with Fahad Mustafa, Saba Hameed and Alishba Yousuf on Hum TV. She then played the lead role of Deeba in ARY Digital's Daagh opposite Fahad Mustafa.
She also appeared as a guest in Nadia Khan Show, Jago Pakistan Jago, Good Morning Pakistan. She also appeared as a contestant in Fear Factor Pakistan in which she was eliminated.

Filmography

Acting

References 

Living people
Pakistani female models
Pakistani television actresses
Actresses from Karachi
Actresses from Lahore
21st-century Pakistani actresses
1982 births